Ctesibius is a genus of soft-bodied plant beetles in the family Artematopodidae. There is at least one described species in Ctesibius, C. eumolpoides.

References

Further reading

 
 
 
 
 
 
 
 

Elateroidea genera